Bitter Melon Farm is the second in a three-part series of compilations by the Mountain Goats, released in 1999 by Ajax Records. It is preceded by Protein Source of the Future...Now!, and followed by Ghana.

Track listing

Personnel
 John Darnielle – vocals, guitar
 Rachel Ware – vocals, bass

References

The Mountain Goats compilation albums
1999 compilation albums